Zeolites are microporous, crystalline aluminosilicate materials commonly used as commercial adsorbents and catalysts. They mainly consist of silicon, aluminium, oxygen, and have the general formula ･y where  is either a metal ion or H+. These positive ions can be exchanged for others in a contacting electrolyte solution.  exchanged zeolites are particularly useful as solid acid catalysts.

The term zeolite was originally coined in 1756 by Swedish mineralogist Axel Fredrik Cronstedt, who observed that rapidly heating a material, believed to have been stilbite, produced large amounts of steam from water that had been adsorbed by the material.

Zeolites occur naturally but are also produced industrially on a large scale. , 253 unique zeolite frameworks have been identified, and over 40 naturally occurring zeolite frameworks are known. Every new zeolite structure that is obtained is examined by the International Zeolite Association Structure Commission (IZA-SC) and receives a three letter designation.

Characteristics

Properties

Zeolites are the aluminosilicate members of the family of microporous materials, and mainly consist of silicon, aluminium, oxygen, and have the general formula ･y where  is either a metal ion or H+. The value of x (Si/Al molar ratio) is greater than 1 and y is the number of water molecules in the formula unit. Zeolites have microporous structures with a typical diameter of 0.3–0.8 nm and accommodate a wide variety of cations, such as Na+, K+, Ca2+, Mg2+ and others. These positive ions are often loosely held and can readily be exchanged for others in a contacting electrolyte solution. Cation exchanged zeolites possess different acidity and catalyze different reactions.. The Si/Al ratio is greater than 1 because zeolites have no Al-O-Al bond (Löwenstein rule).

They are formed by the linking of the corner oxygen atoms of AlO4 and SiO4 tetrahedra to form covalent network structures. The general formula of zeolite, where the  part is ionic bond-like and the  part is covalent bond-like. Zeolites therefore have both ionic crystal and covalent crystal properties, and the balance of these properties depends on the Si/Al ratio (x).

Si/Al ratios below about 3 correspond to natural zeolites and some synthetic zeolites such as A-type and X-type zeolites. They are useful as ion-exchange agents because of their high ion-exchange capacity. Commercially available molecular sieve adsorbents often belong to this group.

Zeolites with a Si/Al ratios higher about 3 are classified as high-silica zeolites, which are rarely found in nature and are synthesized industrially. They possess high physical and chemical stability due to the large covalent bonding contribution. They have excellent hydrophobicity and are suited for adsorption of builky, hydrophobic molecules such as hydrocarbons. In addition to that, high-silica zeolites are  exchangeable, unlike natural zeolites, and are used as solid acid catalysts. The acidity is strong enough to protonate hydrocarbons and high-silica zeolites are used in acid catalysis processes such as fluid catalytic cracking in petrochemical industry.

Apart from the adsorption, catalytic, and other properties of zeolites, it also shows several interesting properties, e.g. window effect, single-file diffusion, and Levitation Effect.

The Levitation Effect is an anomalous diffusion phenomenon observed in all systems with van der Waals interactions.

Framework structure

As of December 2018, the framework structures of 253 different zeolites or their analogues are known, nearly 200 of which can only be synthesized artificially. For each  structure, the International Zeolite Association (IZA) gives a three-letter code called framework type code (FTC). For example, the major molecular sieves, 3A, 4A and 5A, are all LTA (Linde Type A). Most commercially available natural zeolites are of the MOR, HEU or ANA-types.

An example of the notation of the ring structure of zeolite and other silicate materials is shown in the upper right figure. The middle figure shows a common notation using structural formula. The left figure emphasizes the SiO tetrahedral structure. Connecting oxygen atoms together creates a four-membered ring of oxygen (blue bold line). In fact, such a ring substructure is called four membered ring or simply four-ring. The figure on the right shows a 4-ring with Si atoms connected to each other, which is the most common way to express the topology of the framework.

The figure on the right compares the typical framework structures of LTA (left) and FAU (right). Both zeolites share the truncated octahedral structure (sodalite cage) (purple line). However, the way they are connected (yellow line) is different: in LTA, the four-membered rings of the cage are connected to each other to form a skeleton, while in FAU, the six-membered rings are connected to each other. As a result, the pore entrance of LTA is an 8-ring (0.41 nm) and belongs to the small pore zeolite, while the pore entrance of FAU is a 12-ring (0.74 nm) and belongs to the large pore zeolite, respectively. Materials with a 10-ring are called medium pore zeolites, a typical example being ZSM-5 (MFI).

Although more than 200 types of zeolites are known, only about 100 types of aluminosilicate are available. In addition, there are only a few types that can be synthesized in industrially feasible way and have sufficient thermal stability to meet the requirements for industrial use. In particular, the FAU (faujasite, USY), *BEA (beta), MOR (high-silica mordenite), MFI (ZSM-5), and FER (high-silica ferrierite) types are called the big five of high silica zeolites, and industrial production methods have been established.

Porosity
The term molecular sieve refers to a particular property of these materials, i.e., the ability to selectively sort molecules based primarily on a size exclusion process. This is due to a very regular pore structure of molecular dimensions. The maximum size of the molecular or ionic species that can enter the pores of a zeolite is controlled by the dimensions of the channels. These are conventionally defined by the ring size of the aperture, where, for example, the term "eight-ring" refers to a closed-loop that is built from eight tetrahedrally coordinated silicon (or aluminium) atoms and eight oxygen atoms. These rings are not always perfectly symmetrical due to a variety of causes, including strain induced by the bonding between units that are needed to produce the overall structure or coordination of some of the oxygen atoms of the rings to cations within the structure. Therefore, the pores in many zeolites are not cylindrical.

Isomorphous substitution
Isomorphous substitution of Si in zeolites can be possible for some heteroatoms such as titanium, zinc and germanium. Al atoms in zeolites can be also structurally replaced with boron and gallium.

The silicoaluminophosphate type (AlPO molecular sieve), in which Si is isomorphous with Al and P and Al is isomorphous with Si, and the gallogermanate and others are known.

Natural occurrence

Some of the more common mineral zeolites are analcime, chabazite, clinoptilolite, heulandite, natrolite, phillipsite, and stilbite. An example of the mineral formula of a zeolite is: ·2H2O, the formula for natrolite.

Natural zeolites form where volcanic rocks and ash layers react with alkaline groundwater. Zeolites also crystallize in post-depositional environments over periods ranging from thousands to millions of years in shallow marine basins. Naturally occurring zeolites are rarely pure and are contaminated to varying degrees by other minerals, metals, quartz, or other zeolites. For this reason, naturally occurring zeolites are excluded from many important commercial applications where uniformity and purity are essential.

Zeolites transform to other minerals under weathering, hydrothermal alteration or metamorphic conditions. Some examples:
 The sequence of silica-rich volcanic rocks commonly progresses from:
 Clay → quartz → mordenite–heulandite → epistilbite → stilbite → thomsonite → mesolite → scolecite → chabazite → calcite.
 The sequence of silica-poor volcanic rocks commonly progresses from:
 Cowlesite → levyne → offretite → analcime → thomsonite → mesolite → scolecite → chabazite → calcite.

Gemstones 

Thomsonites, one of the rarer zeolite minerals, have been collected as gemstones from a series of lava flows along Lake Superior in Minnesota and, to a lesser degree, in Michigan. Thomsonite nodules from these areas have eroded from basalt lava flows and are collected on beaches and by scuba divers in Lake Superior.

These thomsonite nodules have concentric rings in combinations of colors: black, white, orange, pink, purple, red, and many shades of green. Some nodules have copper inclusions and rarely will be found with copper "eyes". When polished by a lapidary, the thomsonites sometimes displays a "cat's eye" effect (chatoyancy).

Production
Industrially important zeolites are produced synthetically.  Typical procedures entail heating aqueous solutions of alumina and silica with sodium hydroxide.  Equivalent reagents include sodium aluminate and sodium silicate.  Further variations include the use of structure directing agents (SDA) such as quaternary ammonium cations.

Synthetic zeolites hold some key advantages over their natural analogs. The synthetic materials are manufactured in a uniform, phase-pure state. It is also possible to produce zeolite structures that do not appear in nature. Zeolite A is a well-known example. Since the principal raw materials used to manufacture zeolites are silica and alumina, which are among the most abundant mineral components on earth, the potential to supply zeolites is virtually unlimited.

Ore mining

Conventional open-pit mining techniques are used to mine natural zeolites. The overburden is removed to allow access to the ore. The ore may be blasted or stripped for processing by using tractors equipped with ripper blades and front-end loaders. In processing, the ore is crushed, dried, and milled. The milled ore may be air-classified as to particle size and shipped in bags or bulk. The crushed product may be screened to remove fine material when a granular product is required, and some pelletized products are produced from fine material.

, the world's annual production of natural zeolite approximates 3 million tonnes. Major producers in 2010 included China (2 million tonnes), South Korea (210,000 t), Japan (150,000 t), Jordan (140,000 t), Turkey (100,000 t) Slovakia (85,000 t) and the United States (59,000 t). The ready availability of zeolite-rich rock at low cost and the shortage of competing minerals and rocks are probably the most important factors for its large-scale use. According to the United States Geological Survey, it is likely that a significant percentage of the material sold as zeolites in some countries is ground or sawn volcanic tuff that contains only a small amount of zeolites. Some examples of such usage include dimension stone (as an altered volcanic tuff), lightweight aggregate, pozzolanic cement, and soil conditioners.

Synthesis

There are over 200 synthetic zeolites that have been synthesized by a process of slow crystallization of a silica-alumina gel in the presence of alkalis and organic templates. Many more such structures could theoretically be made. In addition to variations in structures, zeolites can also be made with a variety of other atoms in them to make them chemically interesting and active. Some examples of the so-called heteroatoms that have been incorporated include germanium, iron, gallium, boron, zinc, tin, and titanium.  One of the important processes used to carry out zeolite synthesis is sol-gel processing. The product properties depend on reaction mixture composition, pH of the system, operating temperature, pre-reaction 'seeding' time, reaction time as well as the templates used. In the sol-gel process, other elements (metals, metal oxides) can be easily incorporated. The silicalite sol formed by the hydrothermal method is very stable. The ease of scaling up this process makes it a favored route for zeolite synthesis.

Applications
Zeolites are  widely used as catalysts and sorbents. Their well-defined pore structure and adjustable acidity make them highly active in a large variety of reactions. In chemistry, zeolites are used to separate molecules (only molecules of certain sizes and shapes can pass through), and as traps for molecules so they can be analyzed.

Research into and development of the many biochemical and biomedical applications of zeolites, particularly the naturally occurring species heulandite, clinoptilolite, and chabazite has been ongoing.

In organic synthesis
In synthetic chemistry, homogeneous catalysts are preferred because of availability, low cost, and excellent catalytic activity as all the catalytic sites are readily available. But these homogeneous catalysts have several disadvantageous, such as being non-reusable, and require more than the stoichiometric amount. Also, some other drawbacks in its use include the potential dangers in handling, toxicity, corrosive nature, difficulty in separation and recovery, and disposal problems due to the acidic effluent. In addition to that, hydrolysis and purification of the resultant complex results in corrosive by-products. So, the basic idea is to find alternative heterogeneous solid catalysts which are stable, reusable, and nature-friendly, and there has been much attention to finding new ones which will also allow a better work up of reaction  products. Among these different solid catalysts, zeolites were found to be superior due to their shape selectivity, thermal stability, and reusability .

Freidel-Crafts alkylation and acylations using zeolites as catalyst are common in organic synthesis.

Ion exchange and softeners
Zeolites are widely used as ion-exchange beds in domestic and commercial water purification, softening, and other applications.

Earlier, polyphosphates were used to soften hard water. The polyphosphates forms complex with metal ions like Ca2+ and Mg2+ to bind them up so that they could not interfere in cleaning process. However, when this phosphate rich water goes in main stream water, it results in eutrophication of water bodies and hence use of polyphosphate was replaced with use of a synthetic zeolite.

The largest single use for zeolite is the global laundry detergent market. Zeolites are used in laundry detergent as water softeners, removing Ca2+ and Mg2+ ions which would otherwise precipitate from the solution. The ions are retained by the zeolites which releases Na+ ions into the solution, allowing the laundry detergent to be effective in areas with hard water.

Catalysis
Synthetic zeolites, like other mesoporous materials (e.g., MCM-41), are widely used as catalysts in the petrochemical industry, such as in fluid catalytic cracking and hydrocracking. Zeolites confine molecules into small spaces, which causes changes in their structure and reactivity. The acidic forms of zeolites prepared are often powerful solid-state solid acids, facilitating a host of acid-catalyzed reactions, such as isomerization, alkylation, and cracking.

Catalytic cracking uses a reactor and a regenerator. Feed is injected onto a hot, fluidized catalyst where large gasoil molecules are broken into smaller gasoline molecules and olefins. The vapor-phase products are separated from the catalyst and distilled into various products. The catalyst is circulated to a regenerator, where the air is used to burn coke off the surface of the catalyst that was formed as a byproduct in the cracking process. The hot, regenerated catalyst is then circulated back to the reactor to complete its cycle.

Nuclear waste reprocessing

Zeolites have been used in advanced nuclear reprocessing methods, where their micro-porous ability to capture some ions while allowing others to pass freely allows many fission products to be efficiently removed from the waste and permanently trapped. Equally important are the mineral properties of zeolites. Their alumino-silicate construction is extremely durable and resistant to radiation, even in porous form. Additionally, once they are loaded with trapped fission products, the zeolite-waste combination can be hot-pressed into an extremely durable ceramic form, closing the pores and trapping the waste in a solid stone block. This is a waste form factor that greatly reduces its hazard, compared to conventional reprocessing systems. Zeolites are also used in the management of leaks of radioactive materials. For example, in the aftermath of the Fukushima Daiichi nuclear disaster, sandbags of zeolite were dropped into the seawater near the power plant to adsorb the radioactive cesium-137 that was present in high levels.

Gas separation and storage
Zeolites have the potential of providing precise and specific separation of gases, including the removal of H2O, CO2, and SO2 from low-grade natural gas streams. Other separations include noble gases, N2, O2, freon, and formaldehyde.

On-board oxygen generating systems (OBOGS) and oxygen concentrators use zeolites in conjunction with pressure swing adsorption to remove nitrogen from compressed air to supply oxygen for aircrews at high altitudes, as well as home and portable oxygen supplies.

Zeolite-based oxygen concentrator systems are widely used to produce medical-grade oxygen. The zeolite is used as a molecular sieve to create purified oxygen from air using its ability to trap impurities, in a process involving the adsorption of nitrogen, leaving highly purified oxygen and up to 5% argon.

The German group Fraunhofer e.V. announced that they had developed a zeolite substance for use in the biogas industry for long-term storage of energy at a density four times greater than water. Ultimately, the goal is to store heat both in industrial installations and in small combined heat and power plants such as those used in larger residential buildings.

Debbie Meyer Green Bags, a produce storage and preservation product, uses a form of zeolite as its active ingredient. The bags are lined with zeolite to adsorb ethylene, which is intended to slow the ripening process and extend the shelf life of produce stored in the bags.

Clinoptilolite has also been added to chicken food: the absorption of water and ammonia by the zeolite made the birds' droppings drier and less odoriferous, hence easier to handle.

Zeolites are also used as a molecular sieve in cryosorption style vacuum pumps.

Solar energy storage and use
Zeolites can be used to thermochemically store solar heat harvested from solar thermal collectors as first demonstrated by Guerra in 1978 and for adsorption refrigeration, as first demonstrated by Tchernev in 1974. In these applications, their high heat of adsorption and ability to hydrate and dehydrate while maintaining structural stability is exploited. This hygroscopic property coupled with an inherent exothermic (energy releasing) reaction when transitioning from a dehydrated form to a hydrated form make natural zeolites useful in harvesting waste heat and solar heat energy.

Light emission
Zeolites were discovered to help silver naturally emit light, which may compete with fluorescent lights or LEDs.

Building materials
Synthetic zeolites are used as an additive in the production process of warm mix asphalt concrete. The development of this application started in Germany in the 1990s. They help by decreasing the temperature level during manufacture and laying of asphalt concrete, resulting in lower consumption of fossil fuels, thus releasing less carbon dioxide, aerosols, and vapors. The use of synthetic zeolites in hot mixed asphalt leads to easier compaction and, to a certain degree, allows cold weather paving and longer hauls.

When added to Portland cement as a pozzolan, they can reduce chloride permeability and improve workability. They reduce weight and help moderate water content while allowing for slower drying, which improves break strength. When added to lime mortars and lime-metakaolin mortars, synthetic zeolite pellets can act simultaneously as a pozzolanic material and a water reservoir.

Cat litter
Non-clumping cat litter is often made of zeolite (or diatomite), one form of which, invented at MIT, can sequester the greenhouse gas methane from the atmosphere.

Hemostatic agent
QuikClot brand hemostatic agent, which is used to stop severe bleeding, contains a calcium-loaded form of zeolite found in kaolin clay.

Soil treatment

In agriculture, clinoptilolite (a naturally occurring zeolite) is used as a soil treatment. It provides a source of slowly released potassium. If previously loaded with ammonium, the zeolite can serve a similar function in the slow release of nitrogen.

Zeolites can also act as water moderators, in which they will absorb up to 55% of their weight in water and slowly release it under the plant's demand. This property can prevent root rot and moderate drought cycles.

Aquaria
Pet stores market zeolites for use as filter additives in aquaria, where they can be used to adsorb ammonia and other nitrogenous compounds. They must be used with some care, especially with delicate tropical corals that are sensitive to water chemistry and temperature. Due to the high affinity of some zeolites for calcium, they may be less effective in hard water and may deplete calcium. Zeolite filtration is also used in some marine aquaria to keep nutrient concentrations low for the benefit of corals adapted to nutrient-depleted waters.

Where and how the zeolite was formed is an important consideration for aquarium applications. Most Northern hemisphere, natural zeolites were formed when molten lava came into contact with sea water, thereby "loading" the zeolite with Na (sodium) sacrificial ions. The mechanism is well known to chemists as ion exchange. These sodium ions can be replaced by other ions in solution, thus the take-up of nitrogen in ammonia, with the release of the sodium. A deposit near Bear River in southern Idaho is a fresh water variety (Na < 0.05%). Southern hemisphere zeolites are typically formed in freshwater and have a high calcium content.

Zeolite mineral species

The zeolite structural group (Nickel-Strunz classification) includes:
 09.GA. - Zeolites with T5O10 units (T = combined Si and Al) – the fibrous zeolites
 Natrolite framework (NAT): gonnardite, natrolite, mesolite, paranatrolite, scolecite, tetranatrolite
 Edingtonite framework (EDI): edingtonite, kalborsite
 Thomsonite framework (THO): thomsonite-series
 09.GB. - Chains of single connected 4-membered rings
 Analcime framework (ANA): analcime, leucite, pollucite, wairakite
 Laumontite (LAU), yugawaralite (YUG), goosecreekite (GOO), montesommaite (MON)
 09.GC. - Chains of doubly connected 4-membered rings
 Phillipsite framework (PHI): harmotome, phillipsite-series
 Gismondine framework (GIS): amicite, gismondine, garronite, gobbinsite
 Boggsite (BOG), merlinoite (MER), mazzite-series (MAZ), paulingite-series (PAU), perlialite (Linde type L framework, zeolite L, LTL)
 09.GD. - Chains of 6-membered rings – tabular zeolites
 Chabazite framework (CHA): chabazite-series, herschelite, willhendersonite and SSZ-13
 Faujasite framework (FAU): faujasite-series, Linde type X (zeolite X, X zeolites), Linde type Y (zeolite Y, Y zeolites)
 Mordenite framework (MOR): maricopaite, mordenite
 Offretite–wenkite subgroup 09.GD.25 (Nickel–Strunz, 10 ed): offretite (OFF), wenkite (WEN)
 Bellbergite (TMA-E, Aiello and Barrer; framework type EAB), bikitaite (BIK), erionite-series (ERI), ferrierite (FER), gmelinite (GME), levyne-series (LEV), dachiardite-series (DAC), epistilbite (EPI)
 09.GE. - Chains of T10O20 tetrahedra (T = combined Si and Al)
 Heulandite framework (HEU): clinoptilolite, heulandite-series
 Stilbite framework (STI): barrerite, stellerite, stilbite-series
 Brewsterite framework (BRE): brewsterite-series
 Others
 Cowlesite, pentasil (also known as ZSM-5, framework type MFI), tschernichite (beta polymorph A, disordered framework, BEA), Linde type A framework (zeolite A, LTA)

Computational study
Computer calculations have predicted that millions of hypothetical zeolite structures are possible. However, only 232 of these structures have been discovered and synthesized so far, so many zeolite scientists question why only this small fraction of possibilities are observed. This problem is often referred to as "the bottleneck problem". Currently, several theories attempt to explain the reasoning behind this question.
 Zeolite synthesis research has primarily concentrated on hydrothermal methods; however, new zeolites may be synthesized using alternative methods. Synthesis methods that have started to gain use include microwave-assisted, post-synthetic modification, and steam. 
 Geometric computer simulations have shown that the discovered zeolite frameworks possess a behavior known as "the flexibility window". This shows that there is a range in which the zeolite structure is "flexible" and can be compressed but retains the framework structure. It is suggested that if a framework does not possess this property then it cannot be feasibly synthesized.
 As zeolites are metastable, certain frameworks may be inaccessible as nucleation cannot occur because more stable and energetically favorable zeolites will form. Post-synthetic modification has been used to combat this issue with the ADOR method, whereby frameworks can be cut apart into layers and bonded back together by either removing silica bonds or including them.
 Based on dense crystal model systems, the theory of crystallization via solute pre-nucleation clusters was developed. Investigation of zeolite crystallization in hydrated silicate ionic liquids (HSIL) has shown that zeolites can nucleate via the condensation of ion-paired pre-nucleation clusters. This line of research identified several connections between the synthesis medium liquid chemistry and important properties of zeolite crystals, such as the role of inorganic structure-directing agents in zeolite framework selection, the role of ion-pairing on the zeolite molecular composition and topology, and the role of liquid cation mobility on the zeolite crystal size and morphology. Consequently, complex relations exist between the properties of zeolite synthesis media and the crystallizing zeolite, potentially explaining why only a small fraction of the hypothetical zeolite frameworks can be synthesized. While these relations are not yet fully understood, HSIL zeolite synthesis is an exceptional model system for zeolite science, providing opportunities to advance current understanding of the zeolite conundrum.

See also
 , the amorphous alumino-silicate equivalent of zeolite

References

Further reading
 The classic reference for the field has been Breck's book Zeolite Molecular Sieves: Structure, Chemistry, And Use.

External links

 International Zeolite Association
 Database of zeolite pore characterizations 
 The Synthesis Commission of the International Zeolite Association
 Federation of European Zeolite Associations
 British Zeolite Association
 Bulk Zeolite
 Database of Zeolite Structures

Zeolites
Tectosilicates
Antihemorrhagics
Conservation and restoration materials
Porous media
Industrial minerals
Catalysts
Acid catalysts